Novinka is the name of several rural localities in Russia:
Novinka, Amur Oblast, a selo in Novopetrovsky Selsoviet of Blagoveshchensky District, Amur Oblast
Novinka, Astrakhan Oblast, a selo in Novinsky Selsoviet of Volodarsky District, Astrakhan Oblast
, settlement in Vytegorsky District, Vologda Oblast
Others
 Novinka, an imprint of Nova Publishers